Bcl-2 homologous antagonist/killer is a protein that in humans is encoded by the BAK1 gene on chromosome 6. The protein encoded by this gene belongs to the BCL2 protein family. BCL2 family members form oligomers or heterodimers and act as anti- or pro-apoptotic regulators that are involved in a wide variety of cellular activities. This protein localizes to mitochondria, and functions to induce apoptosis. It interacts with and accelerates the opening of the mitochondrial voltage-dependent anion channel, which leads to a loss in membrane potential and the release of cytochrome c. This protein also interacts with the tumor suppressor P53 after exposure to cell stress.

Structure 
BAK1 is a pro-apoptotic Bcl-2 protein containing four Bcl-2 homology (BH) domains: BH1, BH2, BH3, and BH4. These domains are composed of nine α-helices, with a hydrophobic α-helix core surrounded by amphipathic helices and a transmembrane C-terminal α-helix anchored to the mitochondrial outer membrane (MOM). A hydrophobic groove formed along the C-terminal of α2 to the N-terminal of α5, and some residues from α8, binds the BH3 domain of other BCL-2 proteins in its active form.

Function 
As a member of the BCL2 protein family, BAK1 functions as a pro-apoptotic regulator involved in a wide variety of cellular activities. In healthy mammalian cells, BAK1 localizes primarily to the MOM, but remains in an inactive form until stimulated by apoptotic signaling. The inactive form of BAK1 is maintained by the protein’s interactions with VDAC2, Mtx2, and other anti-apoptotic members of the BCL2 protein family. Nonetheless, VDAC2 functions to recruit newly synthesized BAK1 to the mitochondria to carry out apoptosis. Moreover, BAK1 is believed to induce the opening of the mitochondrial voltage-dependent anion channel, leading to release of cytochrome c from the mitochondria. Alternatively, BAK1 itself forms an oligomeric pore, MAC, in the MOM, through which pro-apoptotic factors leak in a process called MOM permeabilization.

Clinical significance
Generally, the pro-apoptotic function of BAK1 contributes to neurodegenerative and autoimmune diseases when overexpressed and cancers when inhibited. For instance, dysregulation of the BAK gene has been implicated in human gastrointestinal cancers, indicating that the gene plays a part in the pathogenesis of some cancers.

BAK1 is also involved in the HIV replication pathway, as the virus induces apoptosis in T cells via Casp8p41, which activates BAK to carry out membrane permeabilization, leading to cell death. Consequently, drugs that regulate BAK1 activity present promising treatments for these diseases.

Recently, one study of the role of genetics in abdominal aortic aneurysm (AAA) showed that different BAK1 variants can exist in both diseased and non-diseased AA tissues compared to matching blood samples. Given the current paradigm that all cells have the same genomic DNA, BAK1 gene variants in different tissues may be easily explained by the expression of BAK1 gene on chromosome 6 and one its edited copies on chromosome 20.

Interactions 

BAK1 has been shown to interact with:
 BCL2-like 1, 
 Bcl-2, 
 MCL1,
 P53,
Casp8p41,
VDAC2,
Mtx2,
Mcl-1,
Bid,
Bim, and
Puma.

References

Further reading

External links 
 

Apoptosis
Programmed cell death
Proteins